Darkness, Take My Hand (1996) is the second book in the Kenzie/Gennaro series by Dennis Lehane.

Plot summary
From the back of the paperback:
When Detectives Patrick Kenzie and Angela Gennaro agree to protect the son of a prominent psychiatrist they soon find bodies are piling up around them. What's more, all the clues point to an unlikely suspect - a serial killer who has been in prison for twenty years, so he can't be killing again, can he?

As the duo try to find out what kind of human being could perform such horrifying acts of mutilation, torture and dismemberment, they discover that the killer's motive is disturbingly rooted in their own past. In a series of heart-stopping climaxes that grow ever more bloody, ever more terrifying, the two detectives work frantically to capture the killer before they become victims themselves.

1996 American novels
Novels by Dennis Lehane
Novels set in Boston